The 3rd constituency of the Ain is a French legislative constituency in the Ain département.

Members elected

Election results

2022

 
 
 
 
|-
| colspan="8" bgcolor="#E9E9E9"|
|-

2017

2016 by-election

2012

|- style="background-color:#E9E9E9;text-align:center;"
! colspan="2" rowspan="2" style="text-align:left;" | Candidate
! rowspan="2" colspan="2" style="text-align:left;" | Party
! colspan="2" | 1st round
! colspan="2" | 2nd round
|- style="background-color:#E9E9E9;text-align:center;"
! width="75" | Votes
! width="30" | %
! width="75" | Votes
! width="30" | %
|-
| style="background-color:" |
| style="text-align:left;" | Etienne Blanc
| style="text-align:left;" | Union for a Popular Movement
| UMP
| 
| 41.55%
| 
| 55.17%
|-
| style="background-color:" |
| style="text-align:left;" | Jean-Marc Fognini
| style="text-align:left;" | Socialist Party
| PS
| 
| 32.68%
| 
| 44.83%
|-
| style="background-color:" |
| style="text-align:left;" | Gaëtan Noblet
| style="text-align:left;" | National Front
| FN
| 
| 13.54%
| colspan="2" style="text-align:left;" |
|-
| style="background-color:" |
| style="text-align:left;" | Christine Franquet
| style="text-align:left;" | The Greens
| VEC
| 
| 4.86%
| colspan="2" style="text-align:left;" |
|-
| style="background-color:" |
| style="text-align:left;" | Yves Thoumine
| style="text-align:left;" | Left Front
| FG
| 
| 4.36%
| colspan="2" style="text-align:left;" |
|-
| style="background-color:" |
| style="text-align:left;" | Delphine Rochet
| style="text-align:left;" | Miscellaneous Right
| DVD
| 
| 1.56%
| colspan="2" style="text-align:left;" |
|-
| style="background-color:" |
| style="text-align:left;" | Sylvie Vermeulen
| style="text-align:left;" | Ecologist
| ECO
| 
| 1.02%
| colspan="2" style="text-align:left;" |
|-
| style="background-color:" |
| style="text-align:left;" | Eric Lahy
| style="text-align:left;" | Far Left
| ExG
| 
| 0.43%
| colspan="2" style="text-align:left;" |
|-
| colspan="8" style="background-color:#E9E9E9;"|
|- style="font-weight:bold"
| colspan="4" style="text-align:left;" | Total
| 
| 100%
| 
| 100%
|-
| colspan="8" style="background-color:#E9E9E9;"|
|-
| colspan="4" style="text-align:left;" | Registered voters
| 
| style="background-color:#E9E9E9;"|
| 
| style="background-color:#E9E9E9;"|
|-
| colspan="4" style="text-align:left;" | Blank/Void ballots
| 
| 1.24%
| 
| 2.49%
|-
| colspan="4" style="text-align:left;" | Turnout
| 
| 53.97%
| 
| 51.27%
|-
| colspan="4" style="text-align:left;" | Abstentions
| 
| 46.03%
| 
| 48.73%
|-
| colspan="8" style="background-color:#E9E9E9;"|
|- style="font-weight:bold"
| colspan="6" style="text-align:left;" | Result
| colspan="2" style="background-color:" | UMP HOLD
|}

2007

|- style="background-color:#E9E9E9;text-align:center;"
! colspan="2" rowspan="2" style="text-align:left;" | Candidate
! rowspan="2" colspan="2" style="text-align:left;" | Party
! colspan="2" | 1st round
! colspan="2" | 2nd round
|- style="background-color:#E9E9E9;text-align:center;"
! width="75" | Votes
! width="30" | %
! width="75" | Votes
! width="30" | %
|-
| style="background-color:" |
| style="text-align:left;" | Etienne Blanc
| style="text-align:left;" | Union for a Popular Movement
| UMP
| 
| 49.99%
| 
| 60.20%
|-
| style="background-color:" |
| style="text-align:left;" | Françoise Rigaud
| style="text-align:left;" | Socialist Party
| PS
| 
| 19.01%
| 
| 39.80%
|-
| style="background-color:" |
| style="text-align:left;" | Fabienne Faure
| style="text-align:left;" | Democratic Movement
| MoDem
| 
| 10.95%
| colspan="2" style="text-align:left;" |
|-
| style="background-color:" |
| style="text-align:left;" | Philippe Virard
| style="text-align:left;" | Communist
| PCF
| 
| 4.99%
| colspan="2" style="text-align:left;" |
|-
| style="background-color:" |
| style="text-align:left;" | Olivier Wyssa
| style="text-align:left;" | National Front
| FN
| 
| 4.70%
| colspan="2" style="text-align:left;" |
|-
| style="background-color:" |
| style="text-align:left;" | Christine Franquet
| style="text-align:left;" | The Greens
| VEC
| 
| 3.46%
| colspan="2" style="text-align:left;" |
|-
| style="background-color:" |
| style="text-align:left;" | Luc Bailly
| style="text-align:left;" | Far Left
| ExG
| 
| 2.40%
| colspan="2" style="text-align:left;" |
|-
| style="background-color:" |
| style="text-align:left;" | Maryse Favre
| style="text-align:left;" | Ecologist
| ECO
| 
| 1.67%
| colspan="2" style="text-align:left;" |
|-
| style="background-color:" |
| style="text-align:left;" | Maurice Juston
| style="text-align:left;" | Movement for France
| MPF
| 
| 1.17%
| colspan="2" style="text-align:left;" |
|-
| style="background-color:" |
| style="text-align:left;" | Emilie Albert
| style="text-align:left;" | Hunting, Fishing, Nature, Traditions
| CPNT
| 
| 1.01%
| colspan="2" style="text-align:left;" |
|-
| style="background-color:" |
| style="text-align:left;" | Dolorès Goutailler
| style="text-align:left;" | Far Left
| ExG
| 
| 0.65%
| colspan="2" style="text-align:left;" |
|-
| style="background-color:" |
| style="text-align:left;" | Jacques Marmorat
| style="text-align:left;" | Divers
| DIV
| 
| 0.00%
| colspan="2" style="text-align:left;" |
|-

| colspan="8" style="background-color:#E9E9E9;"|
|- style="font-weight:bold"
| colspan="4" style="text-align:left;" | Total
| 
| 100%
| 
| 100%
|-
| colspan="8" style="background-color:#E9E9E9;"|
|-
| colspan="4" style="text-align:left;" | Registered voters
| 
| style="background-color:#E9E9E9;"|
| 
| style="background-color:#E9E9E9;"|
|-
| colspan="4" style="text-align:left;" | Blank/Void ballots
| 
| 1.66%
| 
| 2.87%
|-
| colspan="4" style="text-align:left;" | Turnout
| 
| 55.66%
| 
| 52.04%
|-
| colspan="4" style="text-align:left;" | Abstentions
| 
| 44.34%
| 
| 47.96%
|-
| colspan="8" style="background-color:#E9E9E9;"|
|- style="font-weight:bold"
| colspan="6" style="text-align:left;" | Result
| colspan="2" style="background-color:" | UMP HOLD
|}

Sources

 Official results of French elections from 1998: 

3